Fuyang is a town under the administration of Tongjiang County, Sichuan, China. , it administers Fuyangba Residential Community and the following ten villages:
Hongjiang Village
Jinjiaping Village
Xiajiangkou Village
Shilongsi Village
Xietanhe Village
Zhongmatou Village
Huoshuigou Village
Jiahezhai Village
Chengziping Village
Wuxuetang Village

References 

Towns in Sichuan
Tongjiang County